Jasionka  is a village in the administrative district of Gmina Parczew, within Parczew County, Lublin Voivodeship, in eastern Poland.

The village has a population of 870.

References

Jasionka